Mustafa Hüseyin Seyhan (born 23 April 1996) is a Turkish professional footballer who plays as a midfielder for Amed on loan from Bucaspor 1928.

Professional career
A youth product of Gençlerbirliği, Seyhan spent most of his early career in amateur leagues with Hacettepe and Çankaya before returning to Gençlerbirliği in 2019. Seyhan made his professional debut with Gençlerbirliği in a 3-1 Süper Lig loss to Sivasspor on 24 December 2020.

References

External links
 
 

1996 births
People from Altındağ, Ankara
Living people
Turkish footballers
Association football midfielders
Hacettepe S.K. footballers
Gençlerbirliği S.K. footballers
Süper Lig players
TFF First League players
TFF Second League players
TFF Third League players